The 1966–67 AHL season was the 31st season of the American Hockey League. Nine teams played 72 games each in the schedule. The Pittsburgh Hornets finished first overall in the regular season, and won their first Calder Cup championship since being resurrected in 1961–62. It would also be the final season for Pittsburgh in the AHL, replaced by the NHL's Penguins the next season.

Final standings
Note: GP = Games played; W = Wins; L = Losses; T = Ties; GF = Goals for; GA = Goals against; Pts = Points;

Scoring leaders

Note: GP = Games played; G = Goals; A = Assists; Pts = Points; PIM = Penalty minutes

 complete list

Calder Cup playoffs
First round
Pittsburgh Hornets defeated Hershey Bears 4 games to 1.
Baltimore Clippers defeated Quebec Aces 3 games to 2.
Rochester Americans defeated Cleveland Barons 3 games to 2.
Second round
Pittsburgh Hornets earned second round bye.
Rochester Americans defeated Baltimore Clippers 3 games to 1.  
Finals
Pittsburgh Hornets defeated Rochester Americans 4 games to 0, to win the Calder Cup. 
 list of scores

Trophy and award winners
Team awards

Individual awards

Other awards

See also
List of AHL seasons

References
AHL official site
AHL Hall of Fame
HockeyDB

American Hockey League seasons
2
2